is a Japanese actress. She co-starred with Hiroshi Abe in the 2006 Japanese drama Kekkon Dekinai Otoko and in Hirokazu Kore-eda's 2008 film Still Walking.

Filmography

Film

 Sora ga Konnani Aoi Wake ga Nai (1993) - Kaoru Aoki
 Yoru ga Mata Kuru (1994) - Nami Tsuchiya
 Kura (1995) - Seki Yamanaka
 Gonin 2 (1996) - Saki
 The Trap (1996) - Yuriko
 Watashitachi ga Suki datta Koto (1997) - Aiko Shibata
 Shikoku (1999) - Hinako Myoujin
 Acacia no Michi (2001) - Kijima, Miwako
 Distance (2001) - Kiyoka
 Onmyōji (2001) - Fujiwara no Sukehime
 Sotsugyō (2002) - Izumi
 When the Last Sword Is Drawn (2002) - Shizu / Mitsu
 Spy Sorge (2003) - Hideko Ozaki
 Zatōichi (2003) - O-Shino, Hattori's Wife
 Yudan Tateiki (2004) - Miss Makiko
 Hana (2006) - Oryo
 Tales from Earthsea (2006) - The Queen (voice)
 A Gentle Breeze in the Village (2007) - Itoko Migita
 Still Walking (2008) - Yukari Yokoyama
 Ballad (2009) - Kawakami Misako
 The Lone Scalpel (2010) - Namiko Nakamura
 I Wish (2011) - Kyoko (Megumi's Mother)
 Hayabusa: Harukanaru Kikan (2012) - Mari inoue
 Tokyo Family (2013) - Fumiko Hirayama
 A Tale of Samurai Cooking (2013) - Tei
 The Little House (2014) - Yasuko Arai
 Solomon's Perjury (2015) - Kuniko Fujino
 Soromon no gishou: Kouhen saiban (2015) - Kuniko Fujino
 125 Years Memory (2015) - Yuki
 What a Wonderful Family! (2016) - Fumie Hirata
 64: Part I (2016) - Mikami, Minako
 64: Part II (2016) - Mikami, Minako
 What a Wonderful Family! 2 (2017) - Fumie Hirata
 What a Wonderful Family! 3: My Wife, My Life (2018)
 Red Snow (2019) - Sanae Etô
 The Day's Organ (2019) - Fusayo Yanai
 Hotel Royal (2020)

Television
 Taniguchi Rokuzo Shoten (1993)
 Aoi Tori (1997) - Kaori Machimura
 Net Violence (2000)
 Aru Hi Arashi no Yoni (2001)
 Proof of the Man (2004) - Kiriko Motomiya
 Yoshitsune (2005) - Akiko (Tomomori's wife)
 Grave of the Fireflies (2005, TV Movie) - Kyoko Yokokawa (Setsuko's mother)
 Kekkon Dekinai Otoko (2006) - Hayasaka Natsumi
 Toilet no Kamisama (2011)
 Galileo (2013) - Nogi Yuko
 Shizumanu Taiyō (2016)
 Meet Me After School (2018) - Aiko Kuroiwa
 The Fugitive (2020) - Yōko Kakurai
 Ann's Lyrics: Ann Sakuragi's Haiku Lessons (2021)

Awards and nominations

References

External links
 

Living people
Japanese female models
Japanese voice actresses
1968 births
Voice actresses from Kumamoto Prefecture
Japanese film actresses
Japanese television actresses